Venable Tobacco Company Warehouse is a historic tobacco storage warehouse located at Durham, Durham County, North Carolina.  It consists of three storage units: Unit 1 and Unit 2 were built in 1905 and Unit 3 in the 1910s. It is a two-story, brick structure and is an example of "slow burn" masonry and wood factory construction.  The warehouse is located adjacent to the Venable Tobacco Company Prizery and Receiving Room, which collectively are the only structures that remain of a larger complex.

It was listed on the National Register of Historic Places in 1985.

References

Tobacco buildings in the United States
Industrial buildings and structures on the National Register of Historic Places in North Carolina
Industrial buildings completed in 1905
Buildings and structures in Durham, North Carolina
National Register of Historic Places in Durham County, North Carolina
1905 establishments in North Carolina